Son frère may refer to:

 Son frère (novel), a novel by Philippe Besson
 His Brother (film), or Son frère, a 2003 French film based on the novel